Farooq Qaiser (Punjabi, ;  31 October 1945 – 14 May 2021) was a Pakistani artist, newspaper columnist, TV show director, puppeteer, script writer, and voice actor.  He was known as the creator of the fictional puppet character Uncle Sargam introduced in 1976 in children's television show Kaliyan. Farooq was also a cartoonist, newspaper columnist and wrote for the newspaper Daily Nai Baat in Lahore and under the pen name "Meethay Karelay" (English: "Sweet Bitter gourd").

Early life and education 
Farooq Qaiser was born on 31 October 1945 in a Muslim family in Sialkot, Punjab. He spent his early childhood in Peshawar and Kohat, Khyber-Pakhtunkhwa. In 1970, he graduated with a Bachelor of Arts degree in Fine Arts from the National College of Arts (NCA), Lahore. Later he received a master's degree in Graphic Arts from Bucharest, Romania, in 1976 and also trained for puppetry there. He also received his master's degree in Mass Communication in 1999 from the University of Southern California, School for Communication and Journalism, United States.

Career 
Qaiser started his career in the early 1970s after graduating from the National College of Arts, Lahore, with a short documentary in the English language. In 1971, his teacher Salima Hashmi got him involved in her children's television puppet show Akkar Bakkar. In that show, he worked with Shoaib Hashmi, Muneeza Hashmi and Faiz Ahmad Faiz on the scripts and puppets. The show was intended to be Pakistan's version of the American entertainment and educational show Sesame Street. His first assignment on the show was to create a local version of the Big Bird, after which he went on to create many other characters for the program.

In 1976, Qaiser directed and wrote his own puppet show Kaliyan which was broadcast on the national television network, Pakistan Television (PTV). He created his own fictional puppet characters for the show including Uncle Sargam, Haiga and Maasi Museebte. He also was the voice of Uncle Sargam. He created the character Uncle Sargam in resemblance of his teacher Mohan Lal from Romania. The character went on to be a household name in Pakistan for many decades. Speaking about the character, Qaiser said, "he has the same insecurities and fears of every middle class Pakistani. He could say things that a common man wanted to express but could not say".

Some of his other television shows included Putli Tamasha and Sargam Time. Qaiser also worked at the Lahore based Urdu daily newspaper Daily Nai Baat as a cartoonist. He was also a newspaper columnist at the same newspaper and wrote under the pen name Meethay Karelay. He taught for sometime at the Fatima Jinnah Women University in Rawalpindi.

He served on the board of governors at the National Institute of Folk and Traditional Heritage (Lok Virsa), in Islamabad, Pakistan, in 2015. He was a recipient of the Presidential Pride of Performance in 1993. He also served in India as a member of UNESCO providing educational services for two years.

Personal life 
Qaiser was married and had two daughters and a son. He died on 14 May 2021, in Islamabad from a severe heart attack.

Works

Books 
Source(s):
 Hor Puchho
 Kaalam Galoch
 Meethay Karelay
 Meray Piyaray Allah Mian

Characters 
Source:
 Uncle Sargam
 Masi Museebatay
 Haiga
 Sharmeeli
 Rola

Television shows 
Source(s):
 Kaliyan (1976) – Pakistan Television
 Daak Time (1993) – NTM
 Sargam Sargam (1995) – Pakistan Television
 Siyasi Kaliyan (2010) – Dawn News
 Sargam Back Home (2016– continue) – Pakistan Television

Awards and recognition
 Pride of Performance Award by the President of Pakistan in 1993
 9th PTV Awards for Writer Special Award in 1998
 Sitara e Imtiaz awarded by president Arif Alvi on March 23, 2021, for his unmatched performance and contribution towards the entertainment industry of Pakistan for over 4 decades.

References

External links
 Farooq Qaiser interview with Samaa TV in Pakistan

1945 births
2021 deaths
Pakistani columnists
Pakistani expatriates in Romania
Pakistani male journalists
Pakistani graphic designers
Pakistani comics artists
Pakistani television directors
Pakistani puppeteers
Pakistani male voice actors
Pakistani cartoonists
National College of Arts alumni
USC Annenberg School for Communication and Journalism alumni
Pakistani comics writers
Pakistani television writers
Pakistani male television actors
Punjabi people
Artists from Lahore
PTV Award winners
Recipients of the Pride of Performance
Male actors from Lahore
Writers from Lahore
Male television writers